"Going Dumb" is a song by Swedish DJ Alesso and Chinese musician . It was released on 19 March 2021 in two versions: one by the two producers, and another with vocals in Korean from K-pop group Stray Kids. The song accompanies the third anniversary of the battle royale game PUBG Mobile, and is featured as background music in the mobile game. It is Stray Kids' first collaboration.

With the song's debut at number 13 on Billboard Hot Dance/Electronic Songs chart, Forbes noted that Stray Kids became one of the few Korean acts to appear on the chart. A lyric video was released the same day as the song, and a behind-the-scenes music video was released on 8 April 2021, which shows the artists' recording and production process in Seoul, Stockholm and Shanghai. The official music video was released on 7 May.

The remix version by Low Steppa was released on 14 May, and Mike Williams was released on 28 May.

Track listing 
Digital download
 "Going Dumb" – 2:48
 "Going Dumb" (with Stray Kids) – 2:49

Digital download (Low Steppa remix)
 "Going Dumb" (Low Steppa remix) – 3:17

Digital download (Mike Williams remix)
 "Going Dumb" (Mike Williams remix) – 2:46

Credits and personnel 

Credits adapted from Tidal.

 Alesso – producer, songwriter
  – co-producer, vocals
 Stray Kids – vocals 
 Calle Lehmann – co-producer, songwriter
 Haee – songwriter

Charts

Weekly charts

Year-end charts

Release history

References 

2021 singles
2021 songs
Alesso songs
Macaronic songs
Music videos shot in Stockholm
Songs written by Alesso
Stray Kids songs
Song recordings produced by Alesso